Penha is a district in the subprefecture of Penha of the city of São Paulo, Brazil. It's one of the oldest areas in São Paulo and known because of the church Nossa Senhora da Penha, one of the oldest of the city.

References

Districts of São Paulo